The Hospital de Clínicas "José de San Martín" is a teaching hospital located in Buenos Aires, Argentina. It belongs to the University of Buenos Aires (UBA) Faculty of Medical Sciences, currently the best ranked university in that country.

History
The original building of the hospital was designed by the engineer Mauricio Schwartz and was concluded by 1879. Nevertheless, in 1880 during the conflict for the Federalization of Buenos Aires, it was used as barracks for marksmen and hospital for the wounded in the battles of Puente Alsina, Corrales and Barracas.
The Province of Buenos Aires, defeated by the National Army, gave control of the hospital to the Faculty of Medicine of the University of Buenos Aires and, on August 31, 1880, the National Government ratified that decision.
Built accordingly to the models of its time, the design was inspired by the Friedrichshain Hospital in Berlin and the lazaretto in Karlsruhe.
Ever since 1927, due to the old hospital deterioration and according to needs emerging in the previous years, several projects for building a new hospital were planned but never materialized until 1949, when the current building of the Hospital de Clínicas “José de San Martín” was started in the city block formed by the streets Uriburu, Paraguay, Azcuénaga and Córdoba Avenue. The construction suffered numerous delays and only in 1962 did the first services –Radiology and Otorhinolaryngology out-patient clinic- start functioning in the new hospital. The rest of the services were gradually transferred during the following years.
It was during the first years of the 1970s decade that the new building gained full functionality and in 1975 the demolition of the old hospital was started.

Education
The Hospital de Clínicas “José de San Martín” is the most renowned teaching hospital in Argentina. Every year, it receives hundreds of medical students who will spend there the last three years of their medical education. Only medical students from the University of Buenos Aires are accepted.
The hospital also offers a wide span of residency programs for medicine, biochemistry and pharmacy graduates from UBA and other universities as well as foreign graduates, mostly from other countries in Latin America.
Residencies in the Hospital de Clínicas are among the most esteemed programs in Argentina and South America as many of Argentina's medical figures spent their medical careers in this institution.

Achievements
This prestigious institution has been the setting for many firsts in Argentina and worldwide.
 In 1892, Alejandro Posadas described a case of an unknown infectious disease, which later was named Coccidioidomycosis
 In 1901, Abel Ayerza described what is today known as Ayerza syndrome
 In Argentina, insulin was first applied to a human being in the Hospital de Clínicas. In 1923, Bernardo Houssay, head of the Department of Physiology of the Faculty of Medicine of the University of Buenos Aires, started to use the hormone in animal experiments. Later that year –in September 1923- the first application of insulin to a human patient in Argentina took place in the Department of Internal Medicine of the same medical school, located in the Hospital de Clínicas and directed by Professor Dr. Pedro Escudero. The patient was María Ankelevich and the insulin was applied by Pedro Landabure and Félix Puchulu, trainees in the hospital by then.
 International medicine owes Dr. Mariano Rafael Castex (1886–1968), who worked in the Hospital de Clínicas during the 1920s, many discoveries in the field of clinical investigation. The description of the reticular hepatic necrosis in the persistent obstructive jaundice, the increase in the urobilin in it before desobstruction, the meaning of the splitting of the first cardiac sound in the bundle branch block and the discovery of the systolic murmur that carries his name in the myocardial infarction (Castex Murmur or the Holosystolic MR Type Murmur) are just a few of many of his contributions.
 In 1931, Dr. José W. Tobías, who received his medical formation for many years in the Hospital de Clínicas and was then appointed Head Professor of Internal Medicine in the Instituto Modelo of the Hospital Rawson, published the work that described the Tobías’ syndrome (a.k.a. Pancoast-Tobías syndrome).
 In 1932, only three years after Werner Forssmann inserted himself a 65 cm. catheter through his antecubital vein, Dr. Tiburcio Padilla, Dr. Pedro Cossio and Dr. Isaac Berconsky published a work which reproduced Forssmann's, determining hemodynamic values such as the cardiac output, becoming the first cardiac catheterization in America and the third worldwide after Forssmann's in Germany and Jiménez Díaz in Spain.
 Dr. Del Castillo, Dr. Trabucco and Dr. De la Balze described and studied what today is known as Del Castillo syndrome. Del Castillo, brilliant endocrinologist, also described with Dr. Juan Carlos Ahumada in 1932 the Amenorrhoea-Galactorrhoea syndrome (a.k.a. Ahumada-Del Castillo syndrome) of hyperprolactinaemia.
 Medical achievements at Hospital de Clínicas also include the first surgery ever filmed. It was performed by Alejandro Posadas on a hydatid cyst of the lung; the cameraman was Eugène Py, an early French cinematographer
 The Hospital de Clínicas is proudly the first hospital in Argentina to implement the medical residency system. Residencies were inaugurated there in 1944 in response to the efforts made by Dr. Tiburcio Padilla. To be accepted, the candidate must have been a trainee in the Hospital de Clínicas and fix residence in the hospital.

Notable staff

 Ignacio Pirovano
 Andrés Santas
 Roberto Wernicke
 Alejandro Posadas
 Carlos Bonorino Udaondo
 Otto Wernicke
 Abel Ayerza
 Héctor Gotta
 Ernesto Merlo
 José Arce 
 Antonio Battiro
 David Staffieri
 Bernardo Houssay 
 Luis Federico Leloir 
 Alfredo Llambias
 Tomás Insausti
 Mariano Castex
 Enrique Dickmann
 Victor Miatello
 José Ingenieros 
 Germán Dickmann
 Augusto Casanegra
 Enrique Finochietto 
 Adolfo Rey Máximo Castro
 Juan B. Justo 
 Eduardo de Robertis 
 Alfredo Bandoni
 Gregorio Araoz Alfaro
 Pedro Baliña
 Lelio Zeno
 Luis Güemes
 Francisco Arrillaga
 Pascual Palma
 Alfredo Lanari
 Alejandro Castro
 Cleto Aguirre
 Eliseo Roffo
 Egidio Mazzei
 Telma Reca
 Juan Pablo Garrahan
 David Prando
 Pedro Landaburu
 Osvaldo Lourdet
 Pedro Bolo
 Juan Aranguren
 Pedro Chutro
 José J. Tobías
 Ramón Carrillo 
 Alicia Moreau de Justo 
 Juan J. Beretervide
 Aníbal Introzzi
 Manuel Balado
 Rodolfo Dassen
 Julián Fernández
 Pedro Lagleyze
 Félix Puchulu
 Clemente Morel
 Felipe de Elizalde
 Pedro Cossio
 Nicolás Romano
 Luis Agote 
 Guillermo Di Paola
 Alfonso Bonduel
 Nerio Rojas
 Eliseo Segura
 Raúl Carrea
 Pedro A. Pardo
 Ángel Centeno
 Mamerto Acuña
 Marcelino Herrera Vegas
 Telémaco Susini 
 Emilio Astolfi
 Daniel Cranwell
 Pedro Escudero
 Juan Carlos Arauz
 Tiburcio Padilla 
 Enrique Bazterrica
 Santiago Arauz
 Mario Brea
 Juan C. Ahumada
 David Speroni
 Osvaldo Fustinoni
 José Emilio Burucúa

Notes

References

Hospital buildings completed in 1879
Hospital buildings completed in 1949
Hospitals established in 1881
Hospitals in Buenos Aires
Hospitals in Argentina
Medical education in Argentina
Teaching hospitals
University of Buenos Aires
1881 establishments in Argentina